This is a summary of the year 2016 in British music.

Events
10 January – Rock icon David Bowie passes away of liver cancer, two days after the release of his final album; Bowie's illness had not been disclosed to the public until his death. Having stipulated that he did not want a funeral ceremony, Bowie is cremated two days later in New Jersey, USA, with arrangements for his ashes  to be scattered in accordance with Buddhist rituals on the island of Bali.
13 January – Chetham's School of Music announces the appointment of Alun Jones as its new Head, effective September 2016.
28 January – Wigmore Hall live-streams performances for the first time.
 4 February – The City of Birmingham Symphony Orchestra announces the appointment of Mirga Gražinytė-Tyla as its next music director, effective September 2016, with an initial contract of 3 years.  She is the first female conductor to be named music director of the CBSO.
 19 February – The Royal Philharmonic Society announces Sir Peter Maxwell Davies as the recipient of its 102nd Gold Medal.
24 February – The 2016 Brit Awards ceremony takes place at The O2, presented by Ant & Dec. David Bowie is awarded the "Brits Icon" award, a few weeks after his death. Actor Gary Oldman accepts the award on Bowie's behalf.
 2 March – The Bridgewater Hall announces the appointment of Andrew Bolt as its new chief executive.
 21 March – The Gloucester Cathedral Choir announces that it is to recruit girl choristers for the first time in its history, in April 2016.
 22 March – Mark Wigglesworth announces his resignation as music director of English National Opera, effective at the end of the 2015–2016 season.
 18 April – The Royal Northern College of Music announces the appointment of Sir John Tomlinson as its next president, for a term of 5 years, effective January 2017.
 23 April – The London Woodwind Orchestra, the first professional woodwind orchestra in the UK, gives its debut performance at St John's Smith Square.
 29 April – English National Opera announces the appointment of Daniel Kramer as its next artistic director, effective 1 August 2016.
12 May – The Stone Roses release their first new single in 21 years, "All For One", their first new material since their 2011 reformation.
14 May – The United Kingdom will compete in the final of this year's Eurovision Song Contest in Stockholm, Sweden. This year's Joe and Jake will represent the United Kingdom with their song, You're Not Alone
 15 May – Sheku Kanneh-Mason wins the 2016 BBC Young Musician of the Year award.
 10–12 June – Download Festival 2016 takes place at Donington Park in Leicestershire. The Lemmy stage (named in honour of late Motörhead frontman Lemmy Kilmister) was headlined by Rammstein, Black Sabbath and Iron Maiden, the Zippo encore stage by All Time Low, NOFX and Jane's Addiction, the Maverick stage by the Gutterdämmerung project by Bjorn Tagemose, Pennywise and Saxon, and the Dogtooth stage by Raging Speedhorn, Municipal Waste and Napalm Death.
 12 June – Queen's Birthday Honours
 Rod Stewart is made a Knight Bachelor.
 Alison Balsom is awarded an Order of the British Empire (OBE).
 Brian Lang, Colin Lawson, Paul Lewis, John McLeod are each made a Commander of the Order of the British Empire.
 13 June –  The Royal Albert Hall announces that Chris Cotton, its current chief executive, is to retire.
 24 June – Never heard during the composer's lifetime, Still Point by Daphne Oram receives its world premiere at St John's Smith Square, London, 67 years after Oram composed the work.
11 July – Release of Stand As One – Live at Glastonbury 2016, an album of live performances from the 2016 Glastonbury Festival in memory of Jo Cox, the MP recently killed in a violent attack; proceeds from the album will go towards helping Oxfam's work with refugees, Cox having worked for the charity for some years.
 13 July – The Guildhall School of Music and Drama announces the appointment of Lynne Williams as its next principal, effective in 2017.
 2 August – The BBC Scottish Symphony Orchestra announces the appointment of Dominic Parker as its new Director, in succession to Gavin Reid.
 12 September – The Royal Opera House, Covent Garden announces the appointment of Oliver Mears as its next Director of Opera, effective March 2017.
8 October – The Wind in the Willows, a musical by Julian Fellowes with music and lyrics by George Stiles and Anthony Drewe, receives its world première at the Theatre Royal, Plymouth.
16 October – Singer-songwriter Peter Skellern, suffering from an inoperable brain tumour, is ordained as an Anglican priest by the Bishop of Truro.
 21 October – English National Opera announces the appointment of Martyn Brabbins as its new music director, with immediate effect, with an initial contract through October 2020.
 24 October – The Royal Albert Hall announces the appointment of Craig Hassall as its next chief executive, effective 2017.
 4 November – The UK government announced withdrawal of funding support for the proposed new London Concert Hall.
 7 December – Northern Ireland Opera announces the appointment of Walter Sutcliffe as its next artistic director, effective February 2017.
 13 December – The Queen's Hall, Edinburgh announces that its chief executive, Adrian Harris, is to retire at the end of December 2016.
 30 December – New Year's Honours 2017
 Dame Evelyn Glennie is made a Companion of Honour.
 Ray Davies, Jeffrey Tate and Bryn Terfel are each made a Knight Bachelor.
 Lennox Mackenzie and Stephen Maddock are each made an Officer of the Order of the British Empire.
 Iestyn Davies and Anthony Forbes are each made a Member of the Order of the British Empire.

Television series
8 January – Launch of the first series of Lip Sync Battle: UK on Channel 5, a British version of the American musical comedy television show where celebrities lip sync battle each other to various popular songs.
9 January – Launch of the fifth series of The Voice UK, the last to be broadcast by the BBC.

Artists and groups reformed 
 Arab Strap
 Bentley Rhythm Ace
 Meet Me in St. Louis
 Spice Girls – GEM
 Super Furry Animals
 The Vapors
 The Zutons

Groups on hiatus 

 Bombay Bicycle Club
 One Direction

Groups disbanded 
Allo Darlin'
The Bad Shepherds
Bolt Thrower
The Business
Cherry Ghost
Dead or Alive
Funeral for a Friend
FVK
The Enemy
Kosheen
Lush
Maybeshewill
Palma Violets
Viola Beach (all lost their lives in a road accident)
Vondelpark
Wodensthrone

Classical works
 Julian Anderson – Incantesimi
 Sally Beamish
 Chaconne (for organ)
 A Shakespeare Masque (text by Carol Ann Duffy)
 Luke Bedford
 Three Caves
 In Black Bright Ink
 Judith Bingham – The Orchid and Its Hunters
 Harrison Birtwistle – Five Lessons in a Frame
 Mark David Boden – Ghyll
 Charlotte Bray
 Agnus Dei
 Stone Dancer
 Falling in the Fire (for cello and orchestra)
 Diana Burrell – Concerto for Brass and Orchestra
 Paul Carr – Violin Concerto
 Chiu-yu Chou – Tongue
 Desmond Clarke
 Viola Concerto
 Xyla
 Anna Clyne – This Lunar Beauty
 Ronald Corp – "Behold, the sea"
 Tom Coult
 Sonnet Machine
 Spirit of the Staircase
 Laurence Crane – Cobbled Section After Cobbled Section
 Stephen Deazley (music) and Martin Riley (text) – The Rattler
 James Dillon – The Gates for string quartet and orchestra
 Richard Emsley – Strange Attractor
 Edmund Finnis – Parallel Colour
 Alissa Firsova
 Paradisi Gloria
 Bride of the Wind
 Cheryl Frances-Hoad – Game On (for piano and Commodore 64)
 Michael Zev Gordon – In the Middle of Things
 Tom Harrold
 Nightfires
 Raze
 Malcolm Hayes – Violin Concerto
 Morgan Hayes – Overture: The Kiss
 Piers Hellawell – Wild Flow
 Thomas Hyde – Piano Trio: after Picasso
 Patrick John Jones – Locks of the approaching storm
 Mica Levi – Signal Before War
 Zoë Martlew – Broad St. Burlesque
 Christian Mason – Isolarion III
 Benedict Mason – Horns Strings and Harmony
 David Matthews – Norfolk March
 Bayan Northcott – Concerto for Orchestra
 Ben Palmer – Flying in the Fire
 Roxanna Panufnik – Kyrie after Byrd
 Owain Park – Upheld by stillness
 Aaron Parker – After sunset fades
 Anthony Payne – Of Land, Sea and Sky
 Joseph Phibbs – Partita
 John Pickard – Symphony No 5
 Michael Pisaro – fields have ears (10)
 Sophya Polevaya – Carousel
 Francis Pott – Laudate Dominum
 John Powell – A Prussian Requiem
 Alwynne Pritchard – Rockaby
 Ryan Probert – Mattei
 Derek Rodgers – Clarinet Concerto
 Matt Rogers – We Happened to Travel
 David Sawer – April\March
 Frederick Scott – Toccata seconda
  Percy Sherwood – Concerto for violin and cello
 Howard Skempton – Piano Concerto
 Mark-Anthony Turnage – Strapless (ballet in one act, choreography by Christopher Wheeldon)
 Roderick Williams – Ave verum corpus re-imagined
 Scott Wilson – head-neck-chest-four-five-six-thing
 John Woolrich – Swan Song

Opera
Figaro Gets a Divorce by Elena Langer (libretto by David Pountney) is premièred on 21 February 2016 by Welsh National Opera in Cardiff.
Found and Lost by Emily Hall is premièred at the Corinthia Hotel London in January 2016.
Other premieres:
 Thomas Adès and Tom Cairns – The Exterminating Angel
Iain Bell (music), David Antrobus and Emma Jenkins (libretto) – In Parenthesis
David Bruce and Glyn Maxwell – Nothing
 Nicholas Jackson – The Rose and the Ring
 Hannah Kendall and Tessa McWatt – The Knife of Dawn
Stuart MacRae and Louise Welsh – The Devil Inside
Sir Peter Maxwell Davies – The Hogboon
 Mark Simpson and Melanie Challenger – Pleasure
Philip Venables – 4.48 Psychosis

Musical theatre
Fantastic Mr Fox by Sam Holcroft, with music by Arthur Darvill.
Half a Sixpence, co-created by Cameron Mackintosh with book by Julian Fellowes and music and lyrics by George Stiles and Anthony Drewe (also including several songs by David Heneker from the 1963 musical based on the same story.
The Wind in the Willows by Julian Fellowes, with music and lyrics by George Stiles and Anthony Drewe

Musical films
Sing Street

Film scores and incidental music

Film
Erran Baron Cohen & David Buckley – Grimsby
Charlie Mole – Dad's Army
Rachel Portman – Their Finest

Television
Debbie Wiseman – Dickensian

British music awards
Brit Awards – see 2016 Brit Awards

Charts and sales
For the first time in the history of the singles chart, the top three positions were occupied by the same artist. In the chart ending 14 January 2016, Justin Bieber was at number one with "Love Yourself", number two with "Sorry" and number three with "What Do You Mean?".

In the chart ending 4 February, David Bowie matched an album chart record of having 12 albums simultaneously in the top 40, a record set by Elvis Presley following his death in 1977. His album Best of Bowie also became the first ever album to reach number one due to streaming.

In the chart ending 3 November, Elvis Presley broke a record for most number-one albums for a solo artist when his album The Wonder Of You reached number one.

Number-one singles
The singles chart includes a proportion for streaming.

Number-one albums
The albums chart includes a proportion for streaming.

Number-one compilation albums

Best-selling singles

Best-selling albums

Notes:

Deaths
4 January – Robert Stigwood, Australian-born band manager (Bee Gees, Cream) and film producer (Grease, Saturday Night Fever), 81 (death announced on this date)
10 January – David Bowie, singer-songwriter and actor, 69
17 January – Dale Griffin, drummer (Mott the Hoople), 67 (Alzheimer's disease)
24 January – Jimmy Bain, Scottish bassist (Rainbow, Dio), 68
26 January – Colin Vearncombe (aka Black), singer-songwriter, 53 (head injuries sustained in a traffic collision)
9 February – Roy Harris, folk singer, 82
13 February – Members of Viola Beach:
 Kris Leonard, 20, singer and guitarist
 Jack Dakin, 19, drummer
 Tomas Lowe, 27, bassist
 River Reeves, 19, guitarist
 Craig Tarry, 32, manager (road accident)
16 February – Gwyneth George, concert cellist and music academic, 95
18 February – Brendan Healy, 59, actor and musician
19 February – Vi Subversa, musician (Poison Girls), 80
25 February – John Chilton, jazz musician and writer, 83
1 March – Louise Plowright, musical theatre actress, 59 (pancreatic cancer)
8 March – Sir George Martin, Grammy-winning producer and composer, 90
9 March – Jon English, English-born Australian musician and actor, 66 (complications from surgery)
10 March – Keith Emerson, keyboardist (Emerson, Lake and Palmer), 71 (self-inflicted gunshot wound)
14 March – Sir Peter Maxwell Davies, composer and conductor, Master of the Queen's Music (2004–2014), 81
4 April – Royston Nash, conductor, 82
 12 April – Alan Loveday, violinist, 88
15 April – Guy Woolfenden, composer and conductor, 78
25 May – Peggy Spencer, dancer and choreographer, 95
31 May – Tim Feild, musician (The Springfields), 82
3 June – Dave Swarbrick, folk musician and singer-songwriter (Fairport Convention), 75
14 June – Henry McCullough, guitarist (Paul McCartney & Wings), 72
 22 June 
 Mike Hart, singer-songwriter, 72
 Harry Rabinowitz, composer and conductor, 100
 2 July – David Patrick Gedge, organist, 77
13 July – Steven Young, musician (Colourbox, M/A/R/R/S), 53
17 July – Fred Tomlinson, singer (The Two Ronnies, Monty Python's Flying Circus), composer ("The Lumberjack Song") and critic, 88
24 July – Keith Gemmell, saxophonist, clarinetist (Audience), 68
 26 July – Paul Robertson, violinist and leader of the Medici String Quartet, 63
29 July – Ken Barrie, voice actor and singer, 83
30 July – Nigel Gray, record producer (Outlandos d'Amour), 69
14 August – Neil Black, oboist, 84
19 August – Derek Smith, jazz pianist, 85 (death announced on this date)
22 August – Gilli Smyth, singer (Gong), 83
 28 August – John Stenhouse, orchestral bass clarinetist, 74
12 September – Hidayat Inayat Khan, composer and conductor, 99
30 September – Michael Casswell, guitarist, 53
2 October
 Sir Neville Marriner, conductor and violinist, 92
 Thomas Round, opera singer, 100
5 October – Rod Temperton, songwriter, producer and musician (Heatwave), 68
7 October – Anne Pashley, Olympic athlete and opera singer, 80
23 October – Pete Burns, singer (Dead or Alive), 57 (cardiac arrest)
7 November – Sir Jimmy Young, singer and DJ, 95
 11 November – George Reynolds, orchestral trumpeter, 78
22 November – Craig Gill, drummer (Inspiral Carpets), 44
1 December – Micky Fitz, punk singer (The Business) (death announced this date)
7 December – Greg Lake, singer, musician, producer (King Crimson), (Emerson, Lake & Palmer), 69 (cancer)
24 December – Rick Parfitt, singer, musician, (Status Quo), 68 (septicaemia)
25 December – George Michael, singer, 53

See also 
 2016 in British radio
 2016 in British television
 2016 in the United Kingdom
 List of British films of 2016

References 

 
2016